Acatepec is a city and seat of the municipality of Acatepec, in the state of Guerrero, south-western Mexico.  As of 2010, the population was 2,238. Acatepec is the most populous location in its municipality and accounts for less than ten percent of the municipality's population.

References

Populated places in Guerrero